WAKK was a gospel formatted broadcast radio station licensed to McComb, Mississippi, serving South-Central Mississippi.

On September 21, 2011, Charles W. Dowdy, acting as the sole owner of license holder Southwest Broadcasting, Inc., dissolved the corporation and assigned the broadcast licenses it held (WAKK plus sister stations WAKH, WAZA, WAPF, WFCG, WJSH, WKJN, and WTGG) to himself acting as debtor in possession before initiating a Chapter 11 bankruptcy. The Federal Communications Commission (FCC) approved the license transfer on December 19, 2011.

WAKK's license was surrendered on May 4, 2016, and cancelled by the FCC that same day.

References

External links
FCC Station Search Details: DWAKK (Facility ID: 58930)
FCC History Cards for WAKK (covering 1947-1979 as WAPF)

AKK
Defunct radio stations in the United States
Radio stations disestablished in 2016
2016 disestablishments in Mississippi
Defunct religious radio stations in the United States
Radio stations established in 1948
1948 establishments in Mississippi
AKK